The province of Quebec, Canada, is officially divided into 17 administrative regions. Traditionally (and unofficially), it is divided into around twenty regions. They have no government of their own, but rather serve primarily to organize the provision of provincial government services, most significantly the allocation of regional economic development funding.

Function
Administrative regions are used to organize the delivery of provincial government services.

Administrative Regions
Along with the administrative regions, municipalities with 20,000-plus populations in the 2021 Census are also indicated, with those 50,000 or more shown in bold print.

 In January 2000,  administrative region was renamed .

Historical and traditional names
Quebec has a number of regions that go by historical and traditional names. Often, they have similar but distinct French and English names.
 
 Lower Saint Lawrence
  (within )
  (within )
  (eastern part of the  administrative region)
 Chateauguay Valley
 North Shore/Lower North Shore
 Eastern Townships
 /Gaspé
 /Lake St. John
 Magdalen Islands
 James Bay
 
 Laurentians
 
 
 Montreal region/Greater Montreal/Island of Montreal
  (or )
 Nunavik
 Ottawa Valley
 
 
 Quebec City region (corresponds to )
 Rupert's Land
 Saguenay–Lac-Saint-Jean
 South Shore (Montreal)
 Timiskaming
 Ungava District

See also

 Administrative divisions of Canada
 Administrative divisions of Quebec
 Culture of Quebec#Regional cultures
 Regional county municipality
 List of regional county municipalities and equivalent territories in Quebec
 Lists of people from Quebec by region
 Regional conference of elected officers
 Regional municipality, a type of municipal government in Ontario

References

 
 
Regions, List of Quebec